Night of the Twelve is a 1949 German crime film directed by Hans Schweikart and starring Rudolf Fernau, Ferdinand Marian and Mady Rahl.

It was made at the Bavaria Studios in Munich in 1945. It wasn't released before the end of the Second World War, and its eventual premiere took place in 1949. It was one of several crossover films from the Nazi era to debut during the Allied Occupation of Germany.

Cast
 Rudolf Fernau as Rohrbach, Kriminalrat
 Ernst Karchow as Jost, Kriminalkommissar
 Kurt Müller-Graf as Heinze, Kriminalinspektor
 Ferdinand Marian as Leopold Lanski, Agent
 Elsa Wagner as Frau Siebel, Lanskis Wirtin
 Oskar Sima as Schliemann, Villenbesitzer
 Dagny Servaes as Frau von Droste
 Mady Rahl as Lily Kruse
 Alice Treff as Erika Petzold
 Annelies Reinhold as Frau Steffens
 Ellen Hille as Elfriede
 Adolf Gondrell
 Fritz Odemar
 Gerhard Bienert
 Nicolas Koline
 Alois Krüger
 Hildegard Flöricke
 Alexander Fischer-Marich
 Reinhold Pasch
 Arthur Wiesner
 Rudolf Stadler

See also
 Überläufer

References

Bibliography
 Davidson, John & Hake, Sabine. Framing the Fifties: Cinema in a Divided Germany. Berghahn Books, 2007.

External links 
 

1949 films
1949 crime films
German crime films
West German films
1940s German-language films
Films directed by Hans Schweikart
Bavaria Film films
Films shot at Bavaria Studios
German black-and-white films
1940s German films